Lockhart Beach Provincial Park is a provincial park Located 40 km north of Creston, British Columbia, Canada,  on BC Highway 3A. "This park and the adjacent Lockhart Creek Provincial Park extend , from the sunny shores of Kootenay Lake to the headwaters of  Lockhart Creek. "This small park provides the only easy access to public camping along the south arm of Kootenay Lake. An 18 site campground and day use area are located near a sand and fine gravel beach."

Activities  
Canoeing: There are paddling, canoeing and kayaking opportunities at this park.
Fishing: There are fishing opportunities in Kootenay Lake especially for Gerrad Rainbow trout. 
Swimming: There are swimming opportunities in Kootenay Lake at this park. There are no lifeguards on duty at provincial parks.

External links
BC Parks - Lockhart Beach Provincial Park.

Provincial parks of British Columbia
Regional District of Central Kootenay
West Kootenay
Year of establishment missing